Gradyville is an unincorporated community in Edgmont Township in Delaware County, Pennsylvania, United States. Gradyville is located at the intersection of Pennsylvania Route 352 and Gradyville Road.

References

Unincorporated communities in Delaware County, Pennsylvania
Unincorporated communities in Pennsylvania